Julie Paoletti (born 20 December 1991) is a French female canoeist who won medals at senior level of the Wildwater Canoeing World Championships and European Wildwater Championships.

References

External links
 

1991 births
Living people
French female canoeists
Place of birth missing (living people)